Big Dog can refer to:

Entertainment
 Big Dog, a band composed of members of the band Black Grape
 Big Dog (album), a 1996 album by Seven Nation
 "Big Dog", a song from the album Red by the band Guillemots
 "Big Dog", a song by Akon from the soundtrack of The Shaggy Dog
 The Big Dog, a character in the American animated TV series 2 Stupid Dogs
 Big Dog Productions, Jay Leno's production company

Radio stations
The following radio stations are all branded as "Big Dog" or "The Big Dog":
 CHBD-FM
 CILB-FM
 CKTO-FM
 KIOC
 KVVP ("Big Dog Country")
 KXDG
 KYNU
 WDMG-FM
 WQHL (AM)
 WVNA-FM

People
 Stephen Arthurworrey (born 1994), English footballer
 Chris Ciriello (born 1985), Australian field hockey player
 Bill Clinton (born 1946), 42nd president of the United States
 Steve Duemig (1954–2019), American radio sports talk show host
 Leon Gray (1951–2001), American football player
 Victor Hobson (born 1980), American football player
 Larry Huras (born 1955), Canadian hockey player
 Isaiah Johnson (basketball) (born 1994), American basketball player
 Dan Ladouceur (born 1973), Canadian lacrosse player
 Ernie Nevers (1902–1976), American football and baseball player and college football head coach, member of the Pro and College Football Halls of Fame
 Michael Pedersen (born 1986), Danish cricketer
 Tony Pérez (born 1942), Cuban-American baseball player
 Roman Reigns (born 1985), American professional wrestler
 Bryan Robinson (American football, born 1974) (1974–2016), American football player
 Glenn Robinson (born 1973), American basketball player
 Adam Smith-Neale (born 1993), English professional darts player
 Truman Spain (1913–1968), American football player
 Roy "Big Dog" Thirlwall, a former member of the band Len
 Tom Wiesner (1939–2002), American politician and businessman

Places
 Great Dog Island (Tasmania), also known as Big Dog Island
 Big Dog Mountain, part of the Shulaps Range, British Columbia, Canada
 Big Dog Forest, County Fermanagh - see List of parks in Northern Ireland
 Big Dog Canyon, in New Mexico on the western border of the Guadalupe Mountains

Other
 A large dog, dog type, or dog breed.
 BigDog, a quadruped robot 
 Big Dog Motorcycles, an American motorcycle company
 "Big Dog", the ZR2 concept model of the Chevrolet Corvette (C4) car

See also
 Big Dogz, a 2011 album by the Scottish rock band Nazareth
 Magnus Hundt or Magnus Canis (Latin for "big dog") (1449–1519), German philosopher, physician and theologian
 Carlos Eduardo (fighter) (born 1981), Brazilian mixed martial artist nicknamed Cachorrão (Portuguese for "big dog")
 Gustavo Kuerten (born 1976), Brazilian retired tennis player nicknamed Cachorro Grande (Portuguese for "big dog")
 Cachorro Grande (Portuguese for "big dog"), Brazilian rock band
 Esporte Clube São Bernardo, Brazilian football club nicknamed Cachorrão (Portuguese for "big dog")
 Little Dog (disambiguation)

Lists of people by nickname